The Iraqi Governing Council (IGC) was the provisional government of Iraq from 13 July 2003 to 1 June 2004. It was established by and served under the United States-led Coalition Provisional Authority (CPA). The IGC consisted of various Iraqi political and tribal leaders who were appointed by the CPA to provide advice and leadership of the country until the June 2004 transfer of sovereignty to the Iraqi Interim Government (which was replaced in May 2005 by the Iraqi Transitional Government, which was then replaced the following year by the first permanent government).

The Council consisted of 25 members. Its ethnic and religious breakdown included 13 Shias, five Sunnis, five Kurds (also Sunnis), one Turkmen and an Assyrian. Three of its members were women.

In September 2003, the Iraqi Governing Council gained regional recognition from the Arab League, which agreed to seat its representative in Iraq's chair at its meetings. On 1 June 2004, the Council dissolved after choosing member Ghazi Mashal Ajil al-Yawer as the president of the new Iraq interim government. Full sovereignty was transferred to the interim government (and the CPA dissolved) on 28 June.

General information
Though subject to the authority of the CPA administrator Paul Bremer, the council had several key powers of its own. Their duties included appointing representatives to the United Nations, appointing interim ministers to Iraq's vacant cabinet positions, and drafting a temporary constitution, the Transitional Administrative Law (TAL). The TAL spelled out the provisions which were to govern the Iraqi Interim Government, and the timeline for holding elections to a National Assembly, drafting of a permanent constitution to be voted on by the Iraqi people, and elections to a permanent government.

Despite having to answer to the CPA, different factions took on controversial stands.  Religious hardliners won a solid victory when Directive 137 was passed on 29 December 2003.  Passed by the council in less than 15 minutes, it replaced Iraq's former secular family law code with Shari'a family law.  This move met with wide protest among many Iraqi women fearful of how it will affect their freedom to make their own decisions about marriage, alimony, and many other issues where Iraq used to be a leader in the Arab world for women's rights.  Other legislation passed by the council included declaring the day that Baghdad fell to be a national holiday, voting to establish a tribunal to try former government leaders, and banning television stations which are deemed to be supportive of the resistance. A new flag chosen by the council for post-Saddam Iraq created much controversy, in part because of the similarity of color and design with the flag of Israel, and the flag was not adopted.

According to the Law of Administration for the State of Iraq for the Transitional Period, the interim constitution that the Council approved, the Council would cease to function after 30 June 2004, at which point full sovereignty would return to Iraq, and the government will be handed over to a new, sovereign interim government. Instead, the council chose to dissolve itself prematurely.

Presidents of the Iraqi Governing Council

Council Members

The Presidency of the council rotated monthly among eleven of its members. A (p) marks those members above.

Cabinet
On 1 September 2003, the council named its first cabinet. They were:

Minister of Communications – Haider al-Abadi
Minister of Public Works – Nisrin Barwari
Minister of Construction and Housing – Baqir Jabr al-Zubeidi
Minister of the Environment – Abderrahman Sadik Karim
Minister of Trade – Ali Allawi
Minister of Planning – Mahdi al-Hafez
Minister of Education – Alaa Abdessaheb al-Alwan
Minister of Higher Education – Ziad Abderrazzak Mohammad Aswad
Minister of Culture – Mufid Mohammad Jawad al-Jazairi
Minister of Human Rights – Abdel Basset Turki (resigned April 2004)
Minister of Foreign Affairs – Hoshyar Zebari
Minister of Interior – Nuri Badran (resigned April 2004 and replaced by Samir Sumaidaie)
Minister of Agriculture – Abdel Amir Abbud Rahima
Minister of Sport and Youth – Ali Faik al-Ghabban
Minister of Health – Dr. Khodayyir Abbas
Minister of Industry and Minerals – Mohammad Tofiq Rahim
Minister of Justice – Hashim Abderrahman al-Shibli
Minister of Science and Technology – Rashad Mandan Omar
Minister of Work and Social Affairs – Sami Azara al-Majun
Minister of Electricity – Aiham Alsammarae
Minister of Finance – Kamel al-Kilani
Minister of Immigration and Refugees – Mohammad Jassem Khodayyir
Minister of Water Resources – Latif Rashid
Minister of Oil – Ibrahim Mohammad Bahr al-Ulloum
Minister of Transport – Bahnam Zaya Bulos

The Saddam-era positions of Minister of Defense and Minister of Information were dissolved.

References

External links
Iraqi Interim Governing Council

Governing Council
Coalition Provisional Authority
2003 establishments in Iraq
2004 disestablishments in Iraq